Fanny Helembai (born 26 December 1996) is a Hungarian female handball player for Váci NKSE and the Hungarian national team.

She represented Hungary at the 2020 European Women's Handball Championship.

References

External links

1996 births
Living people
People from Vác
Hungarian female handball players
Handball players at the 2020 Summer Olympics
Sportspeople from Pest County